Slesvig is the Danish name for:
 Schleswig, Schleswig-Holstein, a German city
 The former Duchy of Schleswig (also: Southern Jutland)
 A former name for Hedeby, a Viking Age trading center, originally the largest town in the Nordic countries

See also
 Schleswig (disambiguation)